Luke and Murphy Jensen were the defending champions, but they were defeated in the third round by The Woodies.

Byron Black and Jonathan Stark won the championship, defeating the Swedes Jan Apell and Jonas Björkman in the final. It was the first Grand Slam title for the pair, despite Black reaching the World No. 1 ranking earlier this year.

Seeds

Draw

Finals

Top half

Section 1

Section 2

Bottom half

Section 3

Section 4

External links
 Association of Tennis Professionals (ATP) – main draw
1994 French Open – Men's draws and results at the International Tennis Federation

Men's Doubles
1994